Ruzhou is a county-level city in the west-central part of Henan province, China, and is under the administration of Pingdingshan. It was called Linru County until 1988. It has more than 100,000 inhabitants. The Fengxue Temple of Ruzhou features the Qizu Pagoda, built in 738 during the Tang Dynasty (618–907).

The town is best well known for the porcelain made there in the Song Dynasty period.

Yan Yanming murdered students at Ruzhou No. 2 High School in 2004.

Administrative divisions
As 2012, this city is divided to 5 subdistricts, 4 towns and 11 townships.
Subdistricts

Towns

Townships

Climate

Education 

 Ruzhou No. 2 High School
Ruzhou Wangzhai Country Shangzhai Primary School

Transportation 
China National Highway 207

References 
7. Ruzhou Wangzhai Country Shangzhai Primary School  source

Cities in Henan
County-level divisions of Henan
Pingdingshan